Shark Island is a dangerous reef break about 100 metres off Cronulla, New South Wales, Australia. It comprises a rock ledge that is fully exposed at low tide.

The island is a well-known bodyboarding and surfing location. The wave can stand up fast and violently ("jack up" in surfing jargon), making it difficult and dangerous. The island is regarded by bodyboarders as producing one of the "heaviest" waves in the world.

The annual Shark Island Challenge bodyboarding contest is held there, as well as the annual Shark Island Swim Challenge held at Cronulla Beach.

External links
Shark Island surf photographer Chris Dixon (Fine Shark Island ocean and wave art by Australian ocean photographer Chris Dixon. Stunning interior wall art focused on ocean, waves, beaches, surf and seascape photos.)
Shark Island Swim Challenge Annual Swim Event held at Cronulla Beach
Shark Island (pictures, history and wave description)
2001 footage of the heaviest shark island challenge to date

Bodyboarding
Surfing locations in New South Wales
Cronulla, New South Wales